California's 38th State Assembly district is one of 80 California State Assembly districts. It is currently represented by Republican Suzette Martinez Valladares of Santa Clarita.

District profile 
The district encompasses the outer northwestern suburbs of Los Angeles. It consists of the Santa Clarita Valley and Simi Valley, along with parts of the San Fernando Valley, the Sierra Pelona Mountains, and Soledad Canyon.

Los Angeles County – 3.5%
 Agua Dulce
 Castaic
 Los Angeles – 2.3%
 Granada Hills – partial
 Porter Ranch
 Santa Clarita
 Stevenson Ranch

Ventura County – 15.5%
 Simi Valley

Election results from statewide races

List of Assembly Members 
Due to redistricting, the 38th district has been moved around different parts of the state. The current iteration resulted from the 2011 redistricting by the California Citizens Redistricting Commission.

Election results 1992 - present

2020

2018

2016

2014

2012

2010

2008

2006

2004

2002

2000

1998

1996

1994

1992

See also 
 California State Assembly
 California State Assembly districts
 Districts in California

References

External links 
 District map from the California Citizens Redistricting Commission

38
Government of Los Angeles County, California
Government of Ventura County, California
San Fernando Valley
Santa Susana Mountains
Simi Hills
Chatsworth, Los Angeles
Granada Hills, Los Angeles
Santa Clarita, California
Simi Valley, California